Alex Mustakas is a Canadian actor and Theatre Director.  He is the Artistic Director & CEO of Drayton Entertainment, a not-for-profit professional theatre company based in Southwestern Ontario.

Early life 
Mustakas was born in Cyprus and emigrated to Canada at the age of 6, the middle of 3 children.  After watching his parents struggle as immigrants in a new country, his values of giving back were formed after they received help through the Greek-Cypriot community which he calls vital association. As a teenager, one of his first jobs was working for his parents, serving coffee at the Bus Terminal Coffee Shop in Downtown Galt in Cambridge.  While attending Eastwood Collegiate he was a soccer and basketball star but it was apparent he was a performer at heart and drawn to the stage. Teachers encouraged him to attend the National Theatre School but that was not a path approved by his family.  They were adamant he attend university and study business.

After earning a business degree from Wilfrid Laurier University, Mustakas became gainfully employed in the corporate sector.  While thriving in the business world he privately studied voice with Victor Martens and continued to perform with Kitchener-Waterloo Musical Productions.  It was there he met Alan Lund, Artistic Director of the famed Charlottetown Festival.  He decided he wanted to pursue a career as a professional performer.

Following a few years on stage, Mustakas became interested in theatre administration and pursued a master's degree in Arts Administration at City University in London.  While in England, he worked on a project for Gresham College where he evaluated data concerning A Historical Examination of Industrial Support for the Arts in the United Kingdom. When he returned to Canada he launched the Drayton Festival Theatre in 1991 out of a tiny, virtually unused theatre in the crossroads community of Drayton.

Drayton Entertainment 
As popularity continued to grow and the community continued to support the venture, a second stage was added in St. Jacobs – The Schoolhouse Theatre.  The King's Wharf Theatre in Penetanguishene followed suit in 1999. Nestled within Discovery Harbour on Georgian Bay, the rustic theatre was a perfect complement with the venues in Drayton and St. Jacobs. On the outskirts of Grand Bend, the Huron Country Playhouse which meant summer theatre to so many, joined the Drayton Entertainment family of theatres in 2001. To commemorate its 40th Anniversary in 2011, the theatre completed a major renovation, expanding the intimate Huron Country Playhouse II auditorium. Located in the heart of Waterloo Region's Market District, the St. Jacobs Country Playhouse opened to instant acclaim in 2005 and operates year-round in this popular tourism mecca. The most recent venue, Hamilton Family Theatre Cambridge (formerly the Dunfield Theatre Cambridge) Cambridge opened in 2013. Located in the historic neighbourhood of downtown Galt, the complex includes a 500-seat theatre alongside consolidated administration, production and wardrobe facilities for Drayton Entertainment.

Drayton Entertainment does not receive funding from any level of government for its annual operations and annual attendance exceeds 250,000.  This makes Drayton Entertainment one of the largest professional theatre companies in Canada.  It is also recognized by Canadian Actors' Equity Association as one of the largest employers of professional artists in Canada.

Not only does Drayton Entertainment have a significant artistic and economic impact on all the communities it serves but Mustakas also recognizes the importance of youth and theatre. The Youth Usher Program allows youth ages 12 to 15 the opportunity to learn the responsibilities of having a job and be part of a team while gaining valuable work experience as youth ushers at the various theatres. Drayton Entertainment's Youth Musical Theatre Program and Pre-Professional Production Program provide aspiring young performers with opportunities to learn from professional theatre artists.

Major Credits

Director 
Mustakas has directed over 100 productions for Drayton Entertainment and other companies across Canada including several productions of You'll Get Used To It .. The War Show, the Canadian premiere of Rocky: The Musical (2019) and the world premiere of Marathon of Hope: The Musical (2016) – a musical about the life and legacy of Terry Fox. Other directing credits outside of Drayton Entertainment include Rock of Ages at Casino Niagara, the Toronto engagement of Million Dollar Quartet, the North American touring engagement of Dirty Rotten Scoundrels (2008-2009), Twist & Shout: The British Invasion (2008) and Legends (2010) at The Grand in London, as well as Rock Legends and Twist & Shout at Chemainus Festival Theatre, Vancouver Island. He has also directed productions for The Piggery in North Hatley, Quebec; Lighthouse Festival Theatre in Port Dover; Stage West in Mississauga; Theatre Aquarius in Hamilton; Waterloo Region and Toronto Gilbert & Sullivan Societies; K-W Musical Productions and many more.

Producer 
He has also served as producer for a number of productions including Top Dogs, Just for Laughs Festival, Montreal (2010), Official North American touring engagement of Godspell (2013), Official North American touring engagement of Camelot (2009–2010) and the official North American touring engagement of Dirty Rotten Scoundrels (2008–2009).

Actor 
Mustakas has many acting credits to his name including the Drayton Entertainment roles of Franklin Hart (9 to 5 The Musical), The Pirate King (Pirates of Penzance), Captain Hook (Peter Pan), Tito Merelli (Lend Me a Tenor) and Nick (Over the River and Through The Woods). Most recently he appeared as Don Quixote in the 2018 production of Man of La Mancha.

Education 
Mustakas earned a B.A. in Business from Wilfrid Laurier University. He went on to earn his M.A. in Arts Administration from City University in London England.  He later received an Honorary Doctorate in Literature from Wilfrid Laurier University.

Professional Awards & Accomplishments

Personal life

Mustakas is married to Jackie Mustakas (née Hadley).  Jackie is also an actress with a long career with Drayton Entertainment and other theatre companies.  The pair have two children Hadley and Lucas.  Both children have also been on the stage continuing their family tradition.

Media 

 The Record - Waterloo Region entrepreneurs win provincial awards Oct 25 2013 
 The Record - From a dusty historic opera hall to a seven-venue success story, Drayton Entertainment celebrates 25 years May 30, 2015
 Cambridge Times - Meritous Service Medal for Drayton Entertainment’s artistic director June 27, 2017
 Toronto Star - Alex Mustakas started with ‘a little opera house’ and turned it into one of Canada’s most successful theatre companies January 2, 2019

See also
 Drayton Entertainment
 Drayton, Ontario
 Alan Lund

References 

 Drayton Entertainment Official Site
 Canadian Theatre Encyclopedia - Alex Mustakas
 The Inadequate Life Podcast Alex Mustakas
 Alex Mustakas
 Alex Mustakas - Laurier Alumni
 Wilfrid Laurier University School of Business and Economics: Alex Mustakas

Year of birth missing (living people)
Living people
Canadian male stage actors
Wilfrid Laurier University alumni
Canadian artistic directors